The Sugar Run Dolomite is a geologic formation in Illinois. It is a finely-bedded dolomite, preserving fossils dating back to the Silurian period. This formation is named for the Sugar Run stream in Joliet, along which it is well exposed. The dolomite is off-white/grey on freshly cut surfaces, but over time oxidizes to a distinctive cream yellow color, due to trace presence of iron. It is a member of the Niagran series.

Use in architecture
This formation has been quarried for building material since the mid-19th century, sold under the trade name of "Athens marble", and is also known as Joliet or Lemont limestone. It was used widely in the construction of many Chicago homes and buildings from the 1850s-1880s, including the famous Chicago Water Tower. By the 1890s, it fell out of fashion as a building material in favor of more durable Indiana limestone.

See also

 List of fossiliferous stratigraphic units in Illinois

References

 

Silurian Illinois